The 2017 Pocono Green 250 was the 12th stock car race of the 2017 NASCAR Xfinity Series season and the second iteration of the event. The race was held on Saturday, June 10, 2017, Long Pond, Pennsylvania, at Pocono Raceway, a 2.5 miles (4.0 km) triangular permanent course. The race took the scheduled 100 laps to complete. At race's end, Brad Keselowski driving for Team Penske, would make a last lap pass on the final lap to win his 35th career NASCAR Xfinity Series win and his first win of the season. To fill out the podium, Justin Allgaier of JR Motorsports and Kyle Larson of Chip Ganassi Racing would finish second and third, respectively.

Background 

The race was held at Pocono Raceway, which is a three-turn superspeedway located in Long Pond, Pennsylvania. The track hosts two annual NASCAR Sprint Cup Series races, as well as one Xfinity Series and Camping World Truck Series event. Until 2019, the track also hosted an IndyCar Series race.

Pocono Raceway is one of a very few NASCAR tracks not owned by either Speedway Motorsports, Inc. or International Speedway Corporation. It is operated by the Igdalsky siblings Brandon, Nicholas, and sister Ashley, and cousins Joseph IV and Chase Mattioli, all of whom are third-generation members of the family-owned Mattco Inc, started by Joseph II and Rose Mattioli.

Outside of the NASCAR races, the track is used throughout the year by Sports Car Club of America (SCCA) and motorcycle clubs as well as racing schools and an IndyCar race. The triangular oval also has three separate infield sections of racetrack – North Course, East Course and South Course. Each of these infield sections use a separate portion of the tri-oval to complete the track. During regular non-race weekends, multiple clubs can use the track by running on different infield sections. Also some of the infield sections can be run in either direction, or multiple infield sections can be put together – such as running the North Course and the South Course and using the tri-oval to connect the two.

Entry list 

 (R) denotes rookie driver.
 (i) denotes driver who is ineligible for series driver points.

Practice

First practice 
The first practice session was held on Friday, July 7, at 1:00 PM EST. The session would last for 55 minutes.

Second and final practice 
The second and final practice session, sometimes referred to as Happy Hour, was held on Friday, July 7, at 3:00 PM EST. The session would last for 55 minutes.

Qualifying 
Qualifying was held on Saturday, June 10, at 9:35 AM EST. Since Pocono Raceway is at least  in length, the qualifying system was a single car, single lap, two round system where in the first round, everyone would set a time to determine positions 13–40. Then, the fastest 12 qualifiers would move on to the second round to determine positions 1–12.

No drivers would fail to qualify.

Full qualifying results

Race results 
Stage 1 Laps: 25

Stage 2 Laps: 25

Stage 3 Laps: 50

Standings after the race 

Drivers' Championship standings

Note: Only the first 12 positions are included for the driver standings.

References 

2017 NASCAR Xfinity Series
NASCAR races at Pocono Raceway
June 2017 sports events in the United States
2017 in sports in Pennsylvania